Gilles Carpentier (14 June 1950, Paris – 16 September 2016) was a French writer and editor

Biography 
In charge of the manuscript service and member of its reading committee from 1981, he was a full-fledged publisher in 1992 and until 2003. He discovered Agota Kristof with the novel  which became a great success in France and also the writer Abdelhak Serhane. He also edited numerous African and Francophone authors including Aimé Césaire (whose complete poetry he edited), Ahmadou Kourouma, Sony Labou Tansi, Kateb Yacine, Kossi Efoui, or Tierno Monenembo.

Éditions du Seuil greeted him as an "immense reader and discoverer of talent".

He was also the author of six books, which were all in one way or another about one of his favorite subjects, the contemporary city. His latest novel, Les Bienveillantes [not to be mistaken with J. Littell's eponymous work (2006)] is written in an entirely dialogued form.

Les Manuscrits de la marmotte published in 1984, earned him the Prix Fénéon for literature.

Works 
 1984: Les Manuscrits de la marmotte, Éditions du Seuil, Prix Fénéon
 1988: Tous couchés, Seuil
 1992: Haussmann m'empêche de dormir, Seuil
 1994: Scandale de bronze. Lettre à Aimé Césaire, Seuil
 1999: Couper cabèche, Seuil
 2002: Les Bienveillantes, Stock

References 

1950 births
Writers from Paris
2016 deaths
20th-century French non-fiction writers
20th-century French male writers
21st-century French non-fiction writers
French editors
Prix Fénéon winners
French male non-fiction writers